The Star of Rio is a 1955 West German-Italian adventure film directed by Kurt Neumann and starring Maria Frau, Johannes Heesters and Willy Fritsch. It is a remake of the 1940 film of the same title.

It was shot at the Spandau Studios and on location in Brazil with separate German and Italian versions.

Cast
Maria Frau as Chiquita
Johannes Heesters as Don Felipe
Willy Fritsch as Silvester
Jester Naefe as Dina
Franco Andrei as Vincente
Folco Lulli as Mario
Reinhard Kolldehoff as Torres
Kathrin Kohner as Bibi
Stanislav Ledinek as Jao
Hans Stiebner as Goldschmied
Mona Baptiste as Sängerin
Roger George as Tänzer
Lilo Herbeth as Tänzerin
Günther Keil
Franz-Otto Krüger
Annaluise Schubert as Tänzerin
Franz Stein
Rolf Weih

References

External links

1955 adventure films
1955 musical films
Italian adventure films
Italian musical films
German adventure films
German musical films
West German films
1950s German-language films
1950s Italian-language films
Films directed by Kurt Neumann
Remakes of German films
Films shot in Brazil
Films set in Brazil
German multilingual films
Films shot at Spandau Studios
Italian multilingual films
1950s multilingual films
Italian black-and-white films
German black-and-white films
1950s Italian films
1950s German films